Tsutsui Tokujirō (1881-1953) was a Japanese performer born in Osaka, Japan.

Career 
Tokujirō began his performance career at 19, performing in a shinpa troupe led by Fukui Mohei:23 In 1920 he joined a group of actors who were not satisfied with the work of Sawada Shōjirō (沢田正二郎), the artistic director of Shinkokugeki (New National Theatre 新国劇).:23 Together they formed a new troupe, which toured the Kansai region, though they also had several shows in Asakusa.:23 As part of the troupe he 'established a solid reputation in kengeki 剣劇 swordplay dramas.':21

Western tour (1930-31) 
The Tsutsui Troupe was one of the first groups to bring traditional Japanese performance to the United States and Europe. His troupe performed in twenty-two countries,:3 with attendees including seminal directors such as Bertolt Brecht,:255 Jacques Copeau, Charles Dullin, and Vsevolod Meyerhold.:154, n.192

They had a repertoire of sixteen plays that were based on Kabuki plays 'in a mélange of styles with an emphasis on swordplay to appeal to audiences.':154, n.192 Four of the plays were presented only for Japanese residents in California, and were absent from the rest of the tour.:35 Tsutsui emphasised that he 'wanted to put the Western audience in the presence of the true Japanese theatre, such as the Japanese conceive it'.:135 Contemporary critics, however, questioned this authenticity, noting the number of changes Tsutsui made to traditional Japanese theatre.:136 These included the shortened length of the plays (which had to be under two hours),:33 the use of painted scenery and 'enormous stage settings' in a Western style, 'the troupe's replacement of onnagata', roles traditionally played by male transvestites, with actresses. :136

Selected Performance Locations Western Tour

References 

Japan
Japanese culture
Performing arts in Japan

1881 births
1953 deaths